Leaf vegetables, also called leafy greens, pot herbs, vegetable greens, or simply greens, are plant leaves eaten as a vegetable, sometimes accompanied by tender petioles and shoots. Leaf vegetables eaten raw in a salad can be called salad greens.

Nearly one thousand species of plants with edible leaves are known. Leaf vegetables most often come from short-lived herbaceous plants, such as lettuce and spinach.  Woody plants of various species also provide edible leaves.

The leaves of many fodder crops are also edible for humans, but are usually only eaten under famine conditions. Examples include alfalfa, clover, most grasses, including wheat and barley. Food processing, such as drying and grinding into powder or pulping and pressing for juice, may be used to involve these crop leaves in a diet.

Leaf vegetables contain many typical plant nutrients, but since they are photosynthetic tissues, their vitamin K levels are particularly notable. Phylloquinone, the most common form of the vitamin, is directly involved in photosynthesis.

Nutrition 
Spinach, as an example of a leaf vegetable, is low in calories and fat per calorie, and high in dietary fiber, vitamin C, pro-vitamin A carotenoids, folate, manganese and vitamin K.

The vitamin K content of leaf vegetables is particularly high, since these are photosynthetic tissues and phylloquinone is involved in photosynthesis. Accordingly, users of vitamin K antagonist medications, such as warfarin, must take special care to limit consumption of leaf vegetables.

Preparation 

If leaves are cooked for food, they may be referred to as boiled greens.  Leaf vegetables may be stir-fried, stewed, steamed, or consumed raw. Leaf vegetables stewed with pork is a traditional dish in soul food and Southern U.S. cuisine. They are also commonly eaten in a variety of South Asian dishes such as saag. Leafy greens can be used to wrap other ingredients into an edible package in a manner similar to a tortilla. Many green leafy vegetables, such as lettuce or spinach, can also be eaten raw, for example in sandwiches or salads. A green smoothie enables large quantities of raw leafy greens to be consumed by blending the leaves with fruit and water.

Africa 

In certain countries of Africa, various species of nutritious amaranth are very widely eaten boiled.

Celosia argentea var. argentea or "Lagos spinach" is one of the main boiled greens in West African cuisine.

Greece 
In Greek cuisine, khorta (χόρτα, literally 'greens') are a common side dish, eaten hot or cold and usually seasoned with olive oil and lemon.

At least 80 different kinds of greens are used, depending on the area and season, including black mustard, dandelion, wild sorrel, chicory, fennel, chard, kale, mallow, black nightshade, lamb's quarters, wild leeks, hoary mustard, charlock, smooth sow thistle and even the fresh leaves of the caper plant.

Italy 

Preboggion, a mixture of different wild boiled greens, is used in Ligurian cuisine to stuff ravioli and pansoti. One of the main ingredients of preboggion are borage (Borago officinalis) leaves.
Preboggion is also sometimes added to minestrone soup and frittata.

Poland 
Botwinka (or boćwinka) is a soup that features beet stems and leaves as one of its main ingredients. The word "botwinka" is the diminutive form of "botwina" which refers to leafy vegetables like chard and beet leaves.

United States 
In the cuisine of the Southern United States and traditional African-American cuisine, turnip, collard, kale, garden cress, dandelion, mustard, and pokeweed greens are commonly cooked, and often served with pieces of ham or bacon.  The boiling water, called potlikker, is used as broth.  Water in which pokeweed has been prepared contains toxins removed by the boiling, and should be discarded.

Sauteed escarole is a primary ingredient in the Italian-American dish Utica greens.

List of leaf vegetables 

 Agastache foeniculum — anise hyssop (western North America)
 Allium fistulosum — Welsh onion (East Asia)
 Alternanthera sissoo — sissoo spinach (Brazil)
 Basella alba — Malabar spinach(India, Southeast Asia, New Guinea)
 Beta vulgaris — beets, including beet greens, Swiss chard
 Brassica oleracea — wild cabbage, including cabbage, gai lan, Jersey cabbage, kale, red cabbage, savoy cabbage, collard greens, mustard greens, kohlrabi and more
 Brassica rapa — field mustard, including napa cabbage, bok choy, bomdong, choy sum, komatsuna, rapini, tatsoi, and more
 Campanula versicolor — various-colored bellflower (southeastern Italy to the Balkans)
 Chenopodium quinoa — quinoa (western Andes of South America)
 Cichorium endivia — endive, including escarole
 Cichorium intybus — chicory (Europe)
 Claytonia perfoliata — palsingat (western North America)
 Cnidoscolus aconitifolius — chaya (Yucatán Peninsula of Mexico)
 Daucus carota subsp. sativus — carrot (Europe and Southwestern Asia)
 Eruca vesicaria — arugula or rocket (Mediterranean region)
 Foeniculum vulgare — fennel (southern Europe)
 Gynura bicolor — edible gynura (China, Thailand, Myanmar)
 Gynura procumbens — longevity spinach (China, Southeast Asia, and Africa)
 Hemerocallis fulva — orange day-lily (China or Japan)
 Lepidium meyenii — maca (Andes)
 Lactuca sativa — lettuce, including celtuce, iceberg lettuce, red leaf lettuce, romaine lettuce
 Nasturtium officinale — watercress (Europe and Asia)
 Malva moschata — musk mallow (Europe and southwestern Asia)
 Moringa oleifera — moringa (Indian subcontinent)
 Perilla frutescens — shisho perilla (Southeast Asia and Indian highlands)
 Rumex acetosa — garden sorrel (most of Europe, temperate Asia, North America, and Greenland)
 Sassafras albidum — sassafras (eastern North America)
 Sauropus androgynus — katuk (South Asia and Southeast Asia)
 Spinacia oleracea — spinach (central and western Asia)
 Solanum aethiopicum — nakati (Asia and tropical Africa)
 Tropaeolum majus — garden nasturtium (Andes)
 Viola odorata — sweet violet (Europe, northern Africa, Syria)

 Trigonella foenum-graecum - Fenugreek (India)

Postharvest diseases 
Postharvest diseases cause up to 50% losses of leaf vegetables. These are fungal, bacterial, and much less commonly viral. The most important remedy is temperature controlled storage, although also important is prevention of mechanical damage to produce as this provides entryways for pathogens. Uncontaminated water for washing of the vegetables is of lesser but still significant importance.

Common bacterial pathogens include: Xanthomonas campestris pv. vitians, Pseudomonas viridiflava, P. cichorii, and P. marginalis, P. syringae pv. aptata, X. campestris pv. campestris, X. campestris pv. raphani, P. syringae pv. maculicola, P. syringae pv. alisalensis, Pectobacterium spp. including Pectobacterium carotovorum subsp. odoriferum and Pectobacterium aroidearum, Dickeya spp., Pseudomonas marginalis, and Pseudomonas viridiflava.

Common fungal pathogens include: Alternaria brassicicola, A. alternata, A. arborescens, A. tenuissima, A. japonica, Colletotrichum higginsianum, Colletotrichum dematium f. spinaciae, Microdochium panattonianum, Stemphylium botryosum, Cladosporium variabile, Cercospora beticola, C. lactucae-sativae, C. brassicicola, C. acetosella, Botrytis cinerea, Golovinomyces cichoracearum, Podosphaera fusca, Erysiphe cruciferarum, E. polygoni, E. heraclei, Sclerotinia sclerotiorum, and S. minor.

Common oomycete pathogens include: Albugo occidentalis, A. ipomoeae-aquaticae, A. candida, Hyaloperonospora parasitica, Bremia lactucae, Peronospora effusa, and Peronospora farinosa f.sp. betae.

Fungicides such as prochloraz can be used to manage some of these.

Gallery

See also 

 Healthy diet
 List of leaf vegetables
 Leaf protein concentrate
 Mesclun
 Slek
 Herbs
 Spring greens

References 

 
Vegetables